...In Pains is the second album by the Norwegian death metal band Cadaver. It was released in 1992 by Earache Records.

Track listing
  "Bypassed" – 3:35
  "Mr. Tumour's Misery" – 4:27
  "Into the Outside" – 5:06
  "Blurred Visions" – 4:29
  "Runaway Brain" – 4:31
  "Inner Persecution" – 4:58
  "In Distortion" – 2:57
  "The Misanthrope" – 4:18
  "Ins-Through-Mental" – 4:10
  "During the End" – 6:21

Credits
 Anders Odden – Guitar, Effects
 Eilert Solstad – Bass guitar, double bass
 Ole Bjerkebakke – Vocals, Drums, Flute

Cadaver (band) albums
1992 albums
Relativity Records albums
Earache Records albums